Blackland Radio 66.6 (stylized as BLVCKLVND RVDIX 66.6 (1991)) is a mixtape by American rapper SpaceGhostPurrp. It was self-released on May 1, 2011, and re-released in February 2017, by Yeah We On Entertainment. The majority of the mixtape is self-produced, and features guest production and vocals from Lil Ugly Mane, Main Attrakionz, Supa Sortahuman, and J.K. the Reaper. The artwork was created by Lil Ugly Mane and Chino Amobi.

Background 
The mixtape pays homage to the hip hop scene of the 1990s. One of the influences for the album is the hip hop group Three 6 Mafia, which can be heard in the songs "Suck a Nigga Dick for 2011" and "Pheel tha Phonk 1990", and on its cover which was based on the classical Memphis Pen and Pixel style of covers. It features chopped and screwed vocals in some tracks along with game and movie samples such as Mortal Kombat screams and Godzilla sound effects which creates an experimental ambience throughout the mixtape.  Themes on this Mixtape stem from sex to drug abuse, while doing so, over Lo-Fi, trap instrumentals.  Spaceghostpurrp uses Southern Slang throughout the whole album while using extremely vulgar lyrics.

Reception
Blackland Radio 66.6 had a limited acclaim therefore obtaining sparse reviews. Brandon Soderberg of Pitchfork, rated the mixtape 7.1 rating out of 10, stating "Blvcklvnd Rvdix 66.6 (1991) is a mess of Three 6 Mafia-chanting, woozy Wu-Tang loops, DJ Screw wheeze, and Mortal Kombat and Godzilla sound effects, all paired with an off-the-dome rapping style that's equal parts Lil Wayne and Lil B".

Sputnik Music provided a favourable 4.0 out 5. The Miami New Times recognized Blackland Radio 66.6 in its Miami's Ten Best Local Albums, EPs, and Mixtapes of 2011 article, with an in-depth review stating, "The Carol City boy takes his raw rap style to the next dimension with touches of horrorcore, dabbling songs with a feminine screech and a Vincent Price-like laugh. He even gets barebones experimental, leaving hardly a beat on his track Get Yah Head Bust."

Track listing

Sample credits
Information adapted from WhoSampled.

 "Pheel tha Phonk" contains a sample of "Late Night Tip" by Three 6 Mafia.
 "Legend of the East Pyramyds " contains a sample of "Strangers" by Portishead.
 "Tha Real" contains a sample of "Tha Muthaphukkin Real" by Eazy-E featuring MC Ren.
 "Fuck tha Goldiggaz" contains a sample of "Against All Odds" by Makaveli.
 "Captain Planet " contains samples of "Remote Viewing" by Tangerine Dream
 "Underground" contains samples of "Zombie 2 Main Theme" by Zombi 2.
 "Get Yah Head Bust " contains a sample of "Soul Chamber" by Dan Forden.

References

2011 mixtape albums
SpaceGhostPurrp albums